Harold Salt was an English footballer who played in the Football League for Port Vale.

Career
Salt played for Ravensdale, before he signed for Port Vale in December 1925, making his debut at outside left in a 1–0 defeat to Derby County on Christmas Day of 1925. However, he failed to gain a regular place in the squad and played just five Second Division games and one FA Cup game in the 1925–26 season, being released from The Old Recreation Ground in the summer of 1926.

Career statistics
Source:

References

English footballers
Association football wingers
Port Vale F.C. players
English Football League players